True Believer is the twenty-first studio album by country music artist Ronnie Milsap. It was released in 1993, his first for Liberty Records. The album produced two singles, the title track, which peaked at #30 on country charts and "I'm Playing for You," which did not chart.

The album did not chart, his first to do so since his 1971 self-named debut album. Allmusic praised the title track, stating that the record would have been one "to reckon with" if the rest of the tracks "had the energy" of the title song.

Track listing
"Desire"  (Walt Aldridge, Jenny Yates) – 4:38
"I'm Playing for You"  (Lewis Anderson, Keith Stegall) – 4:17
"Somebody's Gonna Get That Girl"  (Marc Beeson, Joanie Chappel-Beeson, Sonny LeMaire) – 3:52
"Better Off with the Blues"  (Donnie Fritts, Delbert McClinton, Gary Nicholson) – 3:59
"Hos Allen Sequé" – :41
"True Believer"  (John Hiatt) – 4:51
"These Foolish Things"  (Harry Link, Holt Marvell, Jack Strachey) – 3:49
"A Million Years Till Then"  (Dennis Morgan, Keith Thomas) – 4:27
"Desperate Man"  (Dave Gibson) – 4:08
"Civil War"  (Carol Chase, Cindy Richardson) – 4:07
"Please Jesus (Send My Baby Home to Me)"  (Michael Stewart) – 4:23

Production
 Producers – Rob Galbraith and Ronnie Milsap
 Recording and Mix Engineers – Mike Clute and Keith Odle
Assistant Recording and Mix Engineer – Randy Gardner
 Digital Editing – Keith Odle and Milan Bogdan
 Mastered by Doug Sax at The Mastering Lab (Hollywood, CA).

Personnel
 Ronnie Milsap – lead and backing vocals, keyboards
 John Barlow Jarvis – keyboards
 Shane Keister – keyboards, synthesizers, programming 
 Brian D. Siewart – synthesizers
 Jay Spell – keyboards
 Catherine Styron – keyboards
 Marc Beeson – acoustic guitar
 Mark Casstevens – acoustic guitar
 Bruce Dees – acoustic guitar, electric guitar, backing vocals 
 John Hiatt – acoustic guitar
 Biff Watson – acoustic guitar 
 Walt Aldridge – electric guitar 
 Jamie Brantley – electric guitar, backing vocals 
 Larry Byrom – electric guitar
 Dann Huff – electric guitar
 Russ Pahl – electric guitar
 Reggie Young – electric guitar
 John Willis – gut-string guitar 
 Dan Dugmore – pedal steel guitar, lap steel guitar
 David Hungate – bass guitar
 Warren Gowers – bass guitar
 Alison Prestwood – bass guitar
 Michael Rhodes – bass guitar
 Bob Wray – bass guitar
 James Ferguson – upright bass
 Darryl Holden – drums
 Kenny Malone – drums
 Lonnie Wilson – drums
 Terry McMillan – percussion, harmonica
 Farrell Morris – percussion
 Sam Levine – saxophone, horn arrangements
 Mike Haynes – trumpet
 Ava Aldridge – backing vocals 
 Jana King – backing vocals
 Marie Lewey – backing vocals
 Cindy Richardson-Walker – backing vocals
 Lisa Silver – backing vocals

Chart

Singles

References
Cooper, Dan. [ True Believer], Allmusic.

1993 albums
Ronnie Milsap albums
Liberty Records albums